General Weir may refer to:

Colin Weir (born 1971), British Army major general
George Alexander Weir (1876–1951), British Army general
Norman Weir (1893–1961), New Zealand Military Forces major general
Stanley Price Weir (1866–1944), Australian Army brigadier general
Stephen Weir (1904–1969), New Zealand Military Forces major general